Marla A. Gallo Brown (born 1970) is an American politician who currently represents the 9th District in the Pennsylvania House of Representatives since 2023. She is a member of the Republican Party.

Early life and education
Brown was born in 1970, the eldest of four siblings. She is of Italian ancestry and was raised in Edinburg, Pennsylvania. Brown graduated from Mohawk High School in 1988. She earned Bachelor of Arts degree from Gannon University in 1992 and a Master of Science from Geneva College in 2000.

Political career
In 2022, Brown won a three-way Republican primary election to challenge incumbent Democratic Pennsylvania State Representative from the 9th District Chris Sainato. She defeated Sainato in the general election.

Personal life
Brown lives in New Castle, Pennsylvania with her husband Greg Brown. She has three children.

Electoral history

References

Living people
Republican Party members of the Pennsylvania House of Representatives
21st-century American politicians
1970 births
American people of Italian descent